Kaniyakurichi is a village in the Pattukkottai taluk of Thanjavur district, Tamil Nadu, India.

Demographics 

As per the 2001 census, Kaniyakurichi had a total population of 1060 with 534 males and 526 females. The sex ratio was 985. The literacy rate was 82.35.

References 

 

Villages in Thanjavur district